Vladimir Orlov may refer to:

 Vladimir Orlov (politician) (1921–1999), Chairman of the Presidium of the Supreme Soviet of the Russian SFSR, 1985-1988
 Vladimir Orlov (speed skater) (born 1938), Russian speed skater
 Vladimir Orlov (author) (1936–2014), Russian fiction writer
  (1743-1831), Russian director of St Petersburg Academy of Sciences 1766-74
 Vladimir Yefimovich Orlov, Minister of Finance of the USSR in 1991
 Vladimir Mitrofanovich Orlov (1895–1938), Russian military leader
 Vladimir Nikolayevich Orlov (1868–1927), Russian military commander and equestrian who represented the Russian Empire at the 1900 Summer Olympics